Ingabire Pascaline (born 1995), is a Rwandan filmmaker, film producer and actress. She is best known for the roles in the drama films Teta, Igikomere and Samantha.

Career
Ingabire began acting when she was in primary four, where she was always participated in school plays. Just after completing high school in 2015, she entered Rwandan cinema and appeared in a number of films such as Samantha, Teta, Ikiguzi Cy’amaraso, Igikomere, Nyirabayazana, Inzira Y’urupfu, Umuzirantenge and Mbirinde. As a director, she is running a YouTube series titled Inzozi (Dreams). In 2021, she acted in the film Selfish.

Personal life
Pascaline Ingabire was born  in Kanombe in Kigali City. She married on July 30, 2019. On 16 April 2021, she gave birth at Kigali University Hospital (CHUK), but the baby died the next day.

References

Living people
Rwandan actresses
1995 births
Rwandan film actors
Rwandan film producers